Darfield is an unincorporated rural community a few miles south of Little Fort, British Columbia, Canada in the Thompson Country along the North Thompson River.

References

Unincorporated settlements in British Columbia
Thompson Country
Populated places in the Thompson-Nicola Regional District